Peak 10, elevation , is a summit in the Tenmile Range of central Colorado. The peak is southwest of Breckenridge in the Arapaho National Forest.

The lowest part of Peak 10 is serviced by Breckenridge Ski Resort's Falcon SuperChair.

See also

List of Colorado mountain ranges
List of Colorado mountain summits
List of Colorado fourteeners
List of Colorado 4000 meter prominent summits
List of the most prominent summits of Colorado
List of Colorado county high points

References

External links

Mountains of Colorado
Mountains of Summit County, Colorado
North American 4000 m summits